The 1980–81 Oklahoma City Chiefs men's basketball team represented Oklahoma City University in the 1980–81 NCAA Division I men's basketball season as a member of the Midwestern City Conference. They finished the season 14-15 overall, tied for second in the MCC regular season title with a 7–4 record and won the 1981 Midwestern City Conference men's basketball tournament. However, the conference did not receive a bid to the NCAA tournament. They were coached by Ken Trickey in his second season as head coach of the Chiefs. They played their home games at Frederickson Fieldhouse in Oklahoma City, Oklahoma.

Schedule

|-
!colspan=12 style=| Regular season

|-
!colspan=12 style=| Midwestern City Conference Tournament

References

Oklahoma City
Oklahoma City Stars men's basketball seasons
Oklahoma City C
Oklahoma City C